The 2014–15 Louisville Cardinals women's basketball team will represent the University of Louisville during the 2014–15 NCAA Division I women's basketball season. The Cardinals, led by eighth-year head coach Jeff Walz, play their home games at the KFC Yum! Center and were in their first year in the Atlantic Coast Conference. They finished the season 27–7, 12–4 in ACC play to finish in third place. They advanced to the semifinals of the ACC women's tournament where they lost to Florida State. They received at-large bid of the NCAA women's tournament where they defeated BYU in the first round, South Florida in the second round before getting upset by Dayton in the sweet sixteen.

Roster

Media
Once again select Cardinals games will be broadcast on WHAS. This year the Cardinals sleight of games on CBS Sports Network will be replaced by a set of games on the ACC RSN. Additional ACC games will air on ESPN3.

All Cardinals basketball games will air on Learfield Sports on WKRD 790 AM or WVKY 101.7 FM, depending on conflicts with Louisville and Kentucky football and men's basketball games.

Schedule

|-
!colspan=9 style="background:#000000; color:#D81E05;"|  Regular Season

|-
!colspan=9 style="background:#000000;"| 2015 ACC Tournament

|-
!colspan=9 style="background:#000000;"| NCAA Women's Tournament

Source

Rankings
2014–15 NCAA Division I women's basketball rankings

See also
Louisville Cardinals women's basketball
2014–15 Louisville Cardinals men's basketball team

References

Louisville Cardinals women's basketball seasons
Louisville
Louisville
Louisville Cardinals women's basketball, 2014-15
Louisville Cardinals women's basketball, 2014-15